The Dr. Wilson Foskett Home and Drugstore are a house and commercial building located on the west side of River Rd. in White Bird, Idaho.  The pair of buildings was listed on the National Register of Historic Places in 2005.

The house, built in 1902, is Queen Anne in style. It was expanded to the rear sometime during 1914–1918. The drugstore building is a one-part commercial block building built between 1910 and 1914.

Wilson Abner Foskett married Loris Taylor in November 1902 and moved into the just-completed new home.  Foskett became a pharmacist to be able to provide medicines to his patients.  Foster died in a car accident in April 1924, likely having fallen asleep while driving, as he returned from delivering a baby at a patient's home.

References

Houses on the National Register of Historic Places in Idaho
Queen Anne architecture in Idaho
Houses completed in 1902
Idaho County, Idaho